Jacques Debelleix (13 March 1934 – 29 September 2012) was a French professional footballer who played as a centre-back.

Honours 
Bordeaux

 Coupe de France runner-up: 1954–55

References 

1934 births
2012 deaths
Sportspeople from Gironde
French footballers
Association football central defenders
FC Girondins de Bordeaux players
Lille OSC players
US Concarneau players
Ligue 1 players
Ligue 2 players
French football managers
Association football player-managers
Association football coaches
US Concarneau managers
FC Girondins de Bordeaux non-playing staff
Footballers from Nouvelle-Aquitaine